Shah Shams ol Din (also Romanized as Shāh Shams ol Dīn and Shāh Shams-od-dīn) is a village in Sohr va Firuzan Rural District, Pir Bakran District, Falavarjan County, Isfahan Province, Iran. At the 2006 census, its population consisted of 11 families, with 56 people on total.

References 

Populated places in Falavarjan County